Matías Nicolás Viña Susperreguy (born 9 November 1997) is an Uruguayan professional footballer who plays as a left-back for Premier League club AFC Bournemouth, on loan from Serie A club Roma, and the Uruguay national team.

Club career
Viña was signed by Nacional in 2015 when he was 17 years old. He joined the Fourth Division and had the opportunity to practice with the professional team. One year later, Viña achieved his first minutes with the club's reserve team, having played eight games in the Third Division. On 31 January 2020, Viña left the club to join Série A side Palmeiras, where he won the treble consisting of the Campeonato Paulista, Copa Libertadores and Copa do Brasil. In August 2021, he signed for A.S. Roma.

On 30 January 2023, Matías joined Premier League club AFC Bournemouth on loan until the end of the season, with an option to buy for €15 million.

International career
Making his debut in 2016 for the Uruguay under-20 team in a friendly against Chile, Viña played in both the 2017 South American U-20 Championship, coming first, and in the 2017 FIFA U-20 World Cup, finishing in fourth place. He played 27 games for the youth selection, scoring four times.

Viña made his senior international debut for Uruguay on 6 September 2019, coming on from the bench in a friendly against Costa Rica. His debut as a starter came four days later, in a friendly against the United States; Viña played the whole 90 minutes in a 1–1 draw.

Career statistics

Club

International

Honours
Nacional
 Uruguayan Primera División: 2019
 Supercopa Uruguaya: 2019

Palmeiras
Copa do Brasil: 2020
Campeonato Paulista: 2020
Copa Libertadores: 2020, 2021

Roma
 UEFA Europa Conference League: 2021–22

Uruguay U20
 South American Youth Football Championship: 2017

Individual
Uruguayan Primera División Player of the Year: 2019
Uruguayan Primera División Team of the Year: 2019

References

External links

 Matías Viña – AUF competition record
 
 

1997 births
Living people
People from Canelones Department
Uruguayan footballers
Association football defenders
Club Nacional de Football players
Sociedade Esportiva Palmeiras players
A.S. Roma players
AFC Bournemouth players
Uruguayan Primera División players
Campeonato Brasileiro Série A players
Serie A players
UEFA Europa Conference League winning players
2021 Copa América players
2022 FIFA World Cup players
Uruguay under-20 international footballers
Uruguay international footballers
Uruguayan expatriate footballers
Expatriate footballers in Brazil
Expatriate footballers in Italy
Expatriate footballers in England
Uruguayan expatriate sportspeople in Brazil
Uruguayan expatriate sportspeople in Italy
Uruguayan expatriate sportspeople in England